Son of Samson (/ Maciste in the Valley of the Kings, also known as Maciste the Mighty) is a 1960 Italian peplum film directed  by Carlo Campogalliani and starring  Mark Forest. The film was distributed to English-speaking countries as Son of Samson, although in the original film, Maciste had no relation to Samson whatsoever.

Plot

During the Persian rule over Egypt (circa 525-480 B.C.), the young prince Kenamon is used to wandering about and mixing with the poor people. Once, he finds himself in a life-threatening situation and is saved by a strong man, Maciste. On another occasion, he sees a beautiful girl, Nofret, and falls in love with her. He talks with his father the Pharaoh Amirteo I, about being much impressed with the hunger and miserable living conditions of the people. His father decides to raise an army against the Persians, but his beautiful but cunning wife Smedes, godmother of Kenamon and allied of the Persian Gran Visir, kills him before he acts. Once on the throne of Pharaoh, Kenamon is drugged with a substance prepared by Smedes, and loses his will-power. Meanwhile, Nofret is about to be sold as a slave. Maciste becomes the leader of the people's revolt, and is acclaimed at the local games. Maciste gets Nofret free, manages not to fall under Smedes' love filters, and gathers and leads a rebellious army against the Persian troops and the palace guard. The Grand Visir and Smedes are killed and thus Kenamon is free from his stupor. Kenamon thanks Maciste for his decisive help, and marries Nofret at last.

Cast   

 Mark Forest as Maciste
 Chelo Alonso as  Queen Smedes
   Vira Silenti  as Tekaet 
 Angelo Zanolli as Pharaoh Kenamun 
 Federica Ranchi 	 as Nofret 
 Carlo Tamberlani  as Pharaoh Armiteo I 
 Nino Musco 	 as Senneka the Camel Driver 
 Zvonimir Rogoz as Grand Visir 
 Ignazio Dolce  as Tradesman

References

External links

1960 adventure films
Peplum films 
Films directed by Carlo Campogalliani
Maciste films
Films set in ancient Egypt
Sword and sandal films
1960s Italian-language films
1960s Italian films